Winning a Battle, Losing the War may refer to:

 "Winning the battle but losing the war", a concept related to a Pyrrhic victory
 "Winning a Battle, Losing the War" (Grey's Anatomy), an episode of the US television medical drama Grey's Anatomy
 "Winning a Battle, Losing the War" (song), a song by Kings of Convenience